Y2K refers to:

 The year 2000 ("Y" stands for "year", and "K" stands for "kilo" which means "thousand")
 The Year 2000 problem (also known as the "Y2K computer bug")

Film and television 
 Y2K (film), a 1999 American television film
 "Y2K" (Dilbert), a television episode
 "Y2K" (My Name Is Earl), a television episode
"Y2K", A fictional rock band in Rugrats (2021 TV series)

Music 
 Y2K (record producer), American record producer
 Y2K (album), by Beenie Man, 1999
 Y2K: The Album or the title song, by Screwball, 2000
 Y2K (EP), by Converge, 1999
 Jackson Y2KV, a guitar designed by Dave Mustaine
 Y2K HC Fest, now Fluff Fest, an annual hardcore punk festival in the Czech Republic

Other 
 MTT Turbine Superbike, also known as Y2K Turbine SUPERBIKE, a turbine-powered motorcycle launched in 2000
 Chris Jericho, whose nickname is Y2J, a parody of Y2K.
 IC3, a Danish/Swedish train set.
 Y2K (Athoba, 'Sex Krome Aasitechhe'), a short film.
 YIIK: A Postmodern RPG, an RPG video game by Ackk Studios.
 Y2K aesthetic, the fashion worn by people in the early 2000s.